Baird's flycatcher (Myiodynastes bairdii) is a species of bird in the family Tyrannidae.
It is found in Ecuador and Peru.
Its natural habitats are subtropical or tropical dry forests, subtropical or tropical moist lowland forests, and heavily degraded former forest.

This bird was named after Spencer Fullerton Baird, a 19th-century naturalist.

References

Baird's flycatcher
Birds of Ecuador
Birds of Peru
Birds of the Tumbes-Chocó-Magdalena
Baird's flycatcher
Baird's flycatcher
Taxonomy articles created by Polbot